Arthur Stephen Lane (December 26, 1910 – October 23, 1997) was a United States district judge of the United States District Court for the District of New Jersey.

Education and career

Born in Arlington, Massachusetts, Lane received a Bachelor of Arts degree from Princeton University in 1934. He received the Moses Taylor Pyne Honor Prize, Princeton's highest undergraduate honor. He received a Bachelor of Laws from Harvard Law School in 1937. He was law secretary to New Jersey Vice Chancellor from 1937 to 1939. He was in the United States Navy as a Commanding Officer from 1942 to 1946. He was an assistant prosecutor for Mercer County, New Jersey from 1946 to 1956. He was in private practice of law in Trenton, New Jersey from 1946 to 1956. He was a Judge of the Mercer County Court from 1956 to 1960.

Political run

Lane was the Republican nominee for New Jersey Senate in 1953, but lost to Democrat Sido L. Ridolfi; Lane and Ridolfi had attended Princeton and Harvard Law at the same time.

Federal judicial service

Lane was nominated by President Dwight D. Eisenhower on June 17, 1960, to a seat on the United States District Court for the District of New Jersey vacated by Judge Phillip Forman. He was confirmed by the United States Senate on August 27, 1960, and received his commission on August 30, 1960. His service was terminated on July 15, 1967, due to his resignation.

Post judicial service

Lane was General Counsel and Director of Johnson and Johnson in New Brunswick, New Jersey from 1967 to 1976. He was in private practice in New Brunswick from 1976 to 1997. He was a member of the New Jersey State Commission of Investigation from 1977 to 1985. He died on October 23, 1997, in Princeton, New Jersey.

References

Sources
 

1910 births
1997 deaths
20th-century American judges
20th-century American lawyers
Harvard Law School alumni
Judges of the United States District Court for the District of New Jersey
New Jersey state court judges
United States district court judges appointed by Dwight D. Eisenhower
United States Navy officers